Santa María is a municipality in the Nueva Segovia Department of Nicaragua.

Municipalities of the Nueva Segovia Department